Murder City is a British crime drama series produced by Granada Television, first broadcast on 18 March 2004 on ITV, that focuses on two mismatched detectives, DI Susan Alembic (Amanda Donohoe) and DS Luke Stone (Kris Marshall), who scour London solving complex cases. The first series consisted of six episodes. A second and final series of four episodes was subsequently commissioned and began broadcast on 5 April 2006. Following declining viewership, a third series of Murder City was not commissioned. BBC America began airing the complete series on 17 August 2006, and it was subsequently released in a Region 1 four-disc DVD box set by Image Entertainment on 14 August 2007.

Characterisation
Whilst the premise of the show features a murder squad investigating complex cases in and around London, the drama created is centered around the realignment of character team-ups. Although DI Susan Alembic (Amanda Donohoe) and DS Luke Stone (Kris Marshall) are the lead characters and partners, writer Robert Murphy frequently separates them at the beginning of each episode by providing them with individual cases to solve. While Alembic is typically partnered with DI Adrian Dumfries (Geff Francis), Dumfries also possessed his own cases, which the episodes followed.

Additionally, character personality alignment frequently varies. Episodes switch between either Stone and Alembic uniting against Dumfries's personality or Dumfries and Alembic conjoining to discourage Stone's theories. However, one episode shows all three sharing a laugh to the chagrin of DCI Sebastian Turner (Tim Woodward). Despite showing the personality failures of each character, the series does not overtly lampoon any character or favour one crime-solving style over another. Both the 'out of the box' and the 'by the book' characters contribute to the solution of their individual cases through their unique approaches.

Cast
 Amanda Donohoe – DI Susan Alembic
 Kris Marshall – DS Luke Stone
 Laura Main – DC Alison Bain
 Tim Woodward – DCI Sebastian Turner
 Amber Agar – Dr Annie Parvez
 Connor McIntyre – DC Frank Craven
 Alexis Conran – Dr Simon Dunne
 Geff Francis – DI Adrian Dumfries (Series 1)
 Tim Dantay – DC Bruce Simner (Series 1)

Characters

Main characters
DI Susan Alembic is possibly one of the more talented DIs in her department, and she partners with the arguably less experienced Luke Stone. Alembic is shown in a very professional respect, with very few references to her personal life. In "Happy Families", it is revealed that Alembic is married with a child, while in "Mr. Right", Alembic chastises Stone for his inability to balance his personal and work lives. Although by the book, Alembic frequently solves the cases she encounters. During the second series, Alembic's character shifted slightly externally, from the professional business-suited exterior of the first series to a more business casual attire constituting jeans and T-shirts. Additionally, despite the hints of a solid marriage and congenial parent-child relationship in the first series, the possibility of her husband's infidelity is hinted at during "Wives and Lovers".

DS Luke Stone is initially used to provide comic relief in the first series and is viewed as impetuous by Dumfries and Turner owing to his outrageous theories. Stone typically provides ironclad evidence for use against suspects. Dumfries refers to him as Alembic's "monkey", and Turner punishes him by assigning him to lone cases. Stone appears as the eccentric genius loner and frames him as a type of wild cannon. Despite a strong connection with Alembic, he avoids long-term relationships and romantically interacting with women outside of sexual liaisons. A recurring joke surrounds his inability to remember the names of his departmental conquests and his difficulty in dealing with Dr. Parvez. In "Mr. Right", he becomes obsessed with a female murder victim. Alembic confronts his overdedication to the job, lack of emotional commitment, and usage of the job as a secondary home. However, Stone's 'inspiration' assists him in solving the perfect crime. And his fascination with the 'throwaway' case in episode two brings to light the murder of a murderer.

Other characters

DC Alison Bain is a very keen, ambitious young detective who holds a passion for finding clues to fit the puzzle. Crafted and taught by Alembic, Bain has a certain tact about her which overshadows Stone's rather upfront and senseless style. Often highlighted by Turner as a well-crafted sergeant of the future, Bain has worked her way up the ranks quickly and has found herself on the murder squad after just three years in the job. The team appear to work well with her, especially Dumfries, who quite often assigns her to clean-up after Stone.

DI Adrian Dumfries serves as the male counterpart of Alembic and her competitor. Although his race added diversity to the cast, his character portrayed a 'head boy' personality. He alternates between partnering with Alembic or competing against her for control of cases while barely disguising his disregard for Stone. Despite his grandstanding, he often contributes to the solution of the mystery. In "Happy Families", he assists Turner in shifting partial financial responsibility for an out-of-control budget onto the DCI from a competing precinct. Additionally, in "Mr. Right", he separates a violent wholesaler from his family. However, for the final two episodes, his character's case contributions diminished. At the end of episode five, he cedes Alembic the crown and steps back from competing with her for case control. In "Nothing Sacred", his character's ego was heavily featured, as it became clear that he cared less about listening to a suspect than attempting to win the 'case-solver' of the week prize offered by Turner.

DC Frank Craven is more of a "get up and let's 'ave him" kind of cop, not afraid to push himself amongst the action and get involved when he is required to. Frank is regularly partnered with Stone, and the pair seem to have a good working relationship. Craven was initially designed to feature in a minor role, assisting Stone with the mathematical equations in "The Critical Path". However, after Tim Dantay left the series, Craven's role was heavily increased, with scenes for "The Critical Path" re-filmed and the scripts for the remaining three episodes re-written to replace Simner with Craven. Craven does not appear in "Happy Families" or "Mr. Right", despite these being midway through the first series, however this was due to the episodes being broadcast out of initial production order.

DC Bruce Simner is a calm and collected individual, who has a passion for being thorough and a confidence when following the rulebook. A star in Turner's eyes, as he was handpicked for the murder squad for an unblemished record as a serving officer, and from past recommendation from his former colleagues. Simner only appears in "Happy Families" and "Mr. Right", as these were the first two episodes to be filmed, after which Dantay left the role due to personal circumstances and was replaced by Connor McIntyre. As the episodes were not broadcast in the order filmed, the opening titles where adjusted twice to accommodate Dantay's arrival and departure.

DCI Sebastian Turner is a very brash, say what you see style cop, who seems to have his mind set further on clean-up rates and budgets than actually caring whether he catches the killer or not. He quietly oversees the covert competition between his two lead inspectors, Alembic and Dumfries, although regularly shows his despise for Stone, often labeling him as Alembic's "monkey". In the second series, Turner interacts increasingly with his team and is quite often seen out in the field assisting with various investigations.

Dr. Annie Parvez is a coroner in the same department as Alembic and Stone. Although attracted to Stone, the recurring theme includes her grudge against him when he did not call her after a date. As a favour, Stone sets up Annie with fellow doctor Simon Dunne, labeling them as the 'Posh and Becks' of pathology. However, after they hit it off after the first date, Stone finds himself becoming increasingly jealous, a fact which Annie is clearly aware of and plays upon to her advantage. Annie deals more with the physical side of pathology, performing post mortems and collecting evidence for the labs to test. In the second series, her role within the team is expanded by using her as a criminal profiler.

Dr. Simon Dunne is a forensic pathologist in the same department as Annie. Simon works more in the computing side of pathology, analyzing evidence and collating it to create patterns to identify a suspect or suspects. Simon finds himself attracted to Annie, and after a little help from Stone, manages to hit it off with her after taking her on a date. Stone and Simon begin to form a bond, and Simon regularly fast-tracks evidence and results in order to aid Stone's investigations and put him in Turner's good books.

Episode list

Series 1 (2004)

Series 2 (2006)

External links

2004 British television series debuts
2006 British television series endings
2000s British crime drama television series
2000s British mystery television series
2000s British police procedural television series
British detective television series
English-language television shows
ITV crime dramas
ITV mystery shows
Murder in television
Television shows produced by Granada Television
Television series by ITV Studios
Television shows set in London